Loreto is a hill town and comune of the Italian province of Ancona, in the Marche. It is most commonly known as the seat of the Basilica della Santa Casa, a popular Catholic pilgrimage site.

Location

Main sights

The city's main monuments occupy the four sides of the piazza: the college of the Jesuits; the Palazzo Comunale (formerly the Palazzo Apostolico), designed by Bramante, that houses an art gallery with works of Lorenzo Lotto, Vouet and Annibale Carracci as well as a collection of maiolica, and the Shrine of the Holy House (Santuario della Santa Casa). It also boasts a massive line of walls, designed by the architect (and military engineer) Antonio da Sangallo the Younger, which were erected from 1518 and reinforced in the 17th century.

Gallery

Twin towns and sister cities

Loreto is twinned with:

  Mariazell, Austria
  Fátima, Portugal
 Altötting, Germany
  Częstochowa, Poland
 Lourdes, France
 Nazareth, Israel
 Harissa, Lebanon
 Għajnsielem, Malta

See also
Shrine of the Holy House
Shrines to the Virgin Mary
Territorial prelature of Loreto
 Sisters of Loreto

References

Notes

External links

Official website
Official website of the sanctuary
Catholic Encyclopedia article Loreto

 
Hilltowns in the Marche
Catholic pilgrimage sites